A season-by-season record of Hallescher FC.

Key 

Key to league record:
P = Played
W = Games won
D = Games drawn
L = Games lost
F = Goals for
A = Goals against
Pts = Points
Pos = Final position

Key to rounds:
R1 = Round 1
R2 = Round 2
R3 = Round 3
R16 = Round of 16
QF = Quarter-finals
SF = Semi-finals
RU = Runners-up
W = Winners

East Germany

Post-reunification

Notes

Seasons
Hallescher FC
Hallescher FC